John Canzano is an American sports columnist, radio talk show host on Portland's 750 AM "The Game". The show is also syndicated in Eugene. and Klamath Falls, Oregon. From 2002 to 2022, he was the lead sports columnist at The Oregonian and a sports commentator on KGW-TV, Portland's NBC affiliate. He now writes his column at JohnCanzano.com and hosts a daily radio show called The Bald-Faced Truth.

Early life and education
Canzano was born in Medford, Oregon. He grew up in Gilroy, California and graduated from Gilroy High School. He graduated from California State University, Chico, in 1995 with a B.A. in English. While at Chico State, he played baseball.

Career
In his career, Canzano has worked at six daily newspapers including The San Jose Mercury News and The Fresno Bee. He covered University of Notre Dame football and Indiana University basketball as the beat writer during the tenure of coach Bob Knight. He is a former national Major League Baseball writer and national NFL writer at the San Jose Mercury News as well. He has also covered five Olympic Games.

Canzano was hired as lead sports columnist at The Oregonian in 2002. He also appears on KGW-TV, where he offers commentary and analysis on sports. Canzano also hosts a radio show called "The Bald-Faced Truth" on Portland's 750 AM "The Game". The radio show airs weekdays from 3-6 p.m. in the Portland metro area. The show is also syndicated in Eugene, Ore. on Fox Sports Eugene (95.7-FM and 1050-AM) and in Klamath Falls, Ore. on KLAD (104.3-FM and 960-AM).

He worked as the NFL and Major League Baseball columnist at the San Jose Mercury News and is a member of the Baseball Writers' Association of America. He holds a Baseball Hall of Fame Vote and is a voter for the Heisman Trophy. Canzano's work has also appeared in GQ magazine and The Sporting News.

Canzano left The Oregonian in March 2022, after 20 years with the newspaper to start his own writing endeavor. In August 2022, he launched a college football podcast centered around the Pac-12 Conference with Jon Wilner of The San Jose Mercury News called "Canzano and Wilner."

Awards and honors
Canzano is a 12-time Associated Press Sports Editors (APSE) award winner. He's won APSE awards in four different writing categories (column, investigative reporting, enterprise and projects), with his most recent awards coming in 2019 and 2018  in the investigative category and in 2016 and 2017 for column writing. In 2008, Canzano was voted America's No. 1 sports columnist among large-circulation newspapers by the APSE. In 2006 and 2007, Canzano finished second in the same category, both times to Bill Plaschke of the Los Angeles Times.

In 2010  and again in 2015, the Society of Professional Journalists named Canzano the National Sports Columnist of the Year.

The Press Club of Atlantic City recognized Canzano with the National Headliner Award national sportswriter of the year in 2004, 2010 and 2014. Canzano's investigative work and reporting about Brenda Tracy, the survivor of an alleged gang raped by four college football players, was recognized as the best sports writing in 2014 with a first place in the National Headliner Awards.

In 2013, Canzano won first place in Special Topic Column Writing in the Best of the West contest for his portfolio of columns that included a column on a soldier who died in action in Afghanistan and Canzano's own experience coaching a girls fourth-grade volleyball team with a player who has Down Syndrome.

In 2002, Canzano was named the nation's top investigative sports writer by the Associated Press News Executives Council for his enterprise piece on Carlos Rodriguez, a 21-year-old Dominican basketball star who was masquerading as a 17-year-old high school basketball player.

Canzano is a six-time Oregon Sportswriter of the Year winner (2005, 2006, 2012, 2013, 2014, 2021) as named by the National Sports Media Association (NSMA). In 2016, the NSMA named Canzano the "Broadcaster of the Year" for the state of Oregon.

Personal life
In July 2010, Canzano married Anna Song, then weekend anchor for Portland television station KATU. He and his wife have three daughters: Dakota, Graziana and Sojourner.

The Bald Faced Truth Foundation
In 2009, Canzano co-founded The Bald Faced Truth Foundation, a 501(c)(3) nonprofit organization funding extracurricular activities for children.

References

External links
John Canzano column archive
John Canzano archive at The Oregonian
John Canzano radio archive at 750-AM The Game
The Bald-Faced Truth Radio ShowTM Website
The Bald-Faced Truth FoundationTM Website

Year of birth missing (living people)
Living people
American radio sports announcers
American sportswriters
Radio personalities from Portland, Oregon
People from Medford, Oregon
Journalists from Oregon
Sportspeople from Portland, Oregon
The Oregonian people
California State University, Chico alumni
Gilroy High School alumni
Television personalities from Portland, Oregon
The Mercury News people